Linkenheim-Hochstetten is a municipality in the district of Karlsruhe, Baden-Württemberg, Germany. It is situated on the right bank of the Rhine, 17 km north of Karlsruhe.

The towns of Linkenheim and Hochstetten merged their municipal governments 1975, newly elected  burgermeister (29.01.2023): Michael Möslang.

The town is served by routes S1 and S11 of the Karlsruhe Stadtbahn, which is operated by the Albtal-Verkehrs-Gesellschaft over the Hardtbahn. Seven stops are served, at Linkenheim Süd, Linkenheim Friedrichstrasse, Linkenheim Rathaus, Linkenheim Schulzentrum, Hochstetten Grenzstrasse, Hochstetten Altenheim and Hochstetten.

References

Karlsruhe (district)